Matrimonial Agency (Italian: Agenzia matrimoniale) is a 1953 Italian comedy film directed by Giorgio Pastina and starring Delia Scala, Aroldo Tieri and Erminio Macario. It was based on a play by Eduardo Scarpetta.

Plot 
Ms. Elena runs a marriage agency in a big city. The most diverse people come to her: Mrs. Amalia doesn't stop complaining about the betrothed chosen for her nephew, Donato has dragged her friend Peppino, a passionate cyclist, there, so that he can finally find a wife. Elena believes that the ideal woman could be her client, Mara, who has a great passion for sport.

When she learns that the rich industrialist who was to marry Mitzi, another client of hers, has died, Elena sends her collaborator Mario, so that he can inform Mitzi as tactfully as possible and propose another suitor. There is also great anticipation for the arrival of Lodolini and the bride found by Elena. Finally, the right time may have come for Mrs. Elena too.

Cast
 Delia Scala as Mitzi  
 Aroldo Tieri as Mario  
 Erminio Macario as Peppino  
 Pina Renzi as Elena  
 Virgilio Riento as Padre di Peppino  
 Vera Carmi as Luisa  
 Fulvia Franco as Mara  
 Galeazzo Benti as Lodolini  
 Laura Gore as Anna  
 Ernesto Almirante as Zio di Lodolini  
  Eva Vanicek  as Ada  
 Oscar Blando as Elio  
 Johanna Hamilton as L'americana  
 Gisella Monaldi as Zia Amalia

References

Bibliography
 Goble, Alan. The Complete Index to Literary Sources in Film. Walter de Gruyter, 1999.

External links

1953 films
1950s Italian-language films
Films directed by Giorgio Pastina
1953 comedy films
Italian comedy films
Italian films based on plays
Films based on works by Eduardo Scarpetta
Films with screenplays by Giovanni Grimaldi
Italian black-and-white films
1950s Italian films